The Serbian Orienteering Federation is the national Orienteering Association in Serbia. It is recognized as the  orienteering association for Serbia by the International Orienteering Federation, of which it is a member.

References

Orienteering
International Orienteering Federation members